Donn Alan Pennebaker (July 15, 1925 – August 1, 2019) was an American documentary filmmaker and one of the pioneers of direct cinema. Performing arts and politics were his primary subjects. In 2013, the Academy of Motion Picture Arts and Sciences recognized his body of work with an Academy Honorary Award. Pennebaker was called by The Independent as "arguably the pre-eminent chronicler of Sixties counterculture".

Life and career

Early life
Pennebaker (known as "Penny" to his friends) was born in Evanston, Illinois, the son of Lucille Levick (née Deemer) and John Paul Pennebaker, who was a commercial photographer. Pennebaker served in the Navy during World War II. He then studied engineering at Yale and later worked as an engineer, founding Electronics Engineering (the makers of the first computerized airline reservation system) before beginning his film career.

Career beginnings
After falling under the influence of experimental filmmaker Francis Thompson, Pennebaker directed his first film, Daybreak Express, in 1953. Set to a classic Duke Ellington recording of the same name, the five-minute short features a shadowy montage of the soon-to-be-demolished Third Avenue elevated subway in New York City.
It was released in 1958. According to Pennebaker, Ellington responded favourably to the film.

In 1959, Pennebaker joined the equipment-sharing Filmakers’ Co-op and co-founded Drew Associates with Richard Leacock and former LIFE magazine editor and correspondent Robert Drew. A crucial moment in the development of direct cinema, the collective produced documentary films for clients like ABC News (for their television series, Close-up) and Time-Life Broadcast (for their syndicated television series, Living Camera). Their first major film, Primary (1960), documented John F. Kennedy and Hubert Humphrey's respective campaigns in the 1960 Wisconsin Democratic Primary election. Drew, Leacock and Pennebaker, as well as photographers Albert Maysles, Terrence McCartney Filgate and Bill Knoll, all filmed the campaigning from dawn to midnight over the course of five days. Widely considered to be the first candid and comprehensive look at the day-by-day events of a Presidential race, it was the first film in which the sync sound camera could move freely with characters throughout a breaking story, a major technical achievement that laid the groundwork for modern-day documentary filmmaking. It would later be selected as an historic American film for inclusion in the Library of Congress' National Film Registry in 1990.

First films and early success
Drew Associates would produce nine more documentaries for Living Camera, including Crisis, which chronicled President Kennedy and Attorney General Robert F. Kennedy's conflict with governor George Wallace over school desegregation. Then in 1963, Pennebaker and Leacock left the organization to form their own production firm, Leacock-Pennebaker, Inc. Pennebaker would direct a number of short films over the course of two years. One of them was a rare recording of jazz vocalist Dave Lambert as he formed a new quintet with singers such as David Lucas and auditioned for RCA. The audition was not successful, and Lambert died suddenly in a car accident shortly thereafter, leaving Pennebaker's film as one of the few visual recordings of the singer, and the only recording of the songs in those rehearsals. The documentary got attention in Europe, and a few weeks later, Bob Dylan's manager Albert Grossman approached Pennebaker about filming Dylan while he was touring in England. The resulting work Dont Look Back (there is no apostrophe in the title) became a landmark in both film and rock history, "evoking the '60s like few other documents", according to film critic Jonathan Rosenbaum. The opening sequence alone (set to Dylan's "Subterranean Homesick Blues" with Dylan standing in an alleyway, dropping cardboard flash cards) became a precursor to modern music videos. It was even used as the theatrical trailer. It would later be included in the Library of Congress' National Film Registry in 1998, and it was later ranked at No. 6 on Time Outs list of the 50 best documentaries of all time.

Pennebaker would also film Dylan's subsequent tour of England in 1966, but while some of this work has been released in different forms (supplying the framework for Martin Scorsese's Dylan documentary No Direction Home and re-edited by Dylan himself in the rarely distributed Eat the Document), Pennebaker's own film of the tour (Something Is Happening) remains unreleased. Nevertheless, the tour itself has become one of the most celebrated events in rock history, and some of the Nagra recordings made for Pennebaker's film were later released on Dylan's own records. All of the Nagra recordings made during the 1966 European appearances were made by Richard Alderson, who, for years, never received recognition. All of his tapes are what comprise the 36-CD box set Bob Dylan: The 1966 Live Recordings, released in 2016. It is Alderson who notes that many of the UK concerts were, in fact, filmed by Howard Alk.

The same year Dont Look Back was released in theaters, Pennebaker worked with author Norman Mailer (who would later appear in 1979's Town Bloody Hall) on the first of many film collaborations. He was also hired to film the Monterey Pop Festival, which is now regarded as an important event in rock history on par with 1969's Woodstock Festival. Pennebaker produced a number of films from the event, capturing breakthrough performances from the Jimi Hendrix Experience, Otis Redding and Janis Joplin that remain seminal documents in rock history. The first of these films, Monterey Pop, was released in 1968 and was later ranked at No. 42 on Time Outs list of the 50 best documentaries of all time. Other performers including Jefferson Airplane and the Who also received major exposure from Pennebaker's work.

1970s–1990s
Pennebaker continued to film some of the era's most influential rock artists, including John Lennon (whom he first met while filming Dylan in England), Little Richard, Jerry Lee Lewis, and David Bowie during his "farewell" concert in 1973.

In 1970, Pennebaker filmed the cast recording session for Stephen Sondheim and George Furth's musical, Company, shortly after the show opened on Broadway. The film was initially intended to be a television pilot chronicling recording processes of Broadway musicals, but despite wide acclaim the series was scrapped after the original producers left New York to head production at MGM. No other sessions were captured, and Pennebaker's film remains the sole episode. Original Cast Album: Company received renewed attention after being parodied in the IFC television series  Documentary Now! in 2019, then being added to The Criterion Channel's streaming service the following year. In August 2021 a physical edition was released, including new commentary by Sondheim and commentary recorded in 2001 by Pennebaker, original director Hal Prince, and Company star Elaine Stritch.

Pennebaker was one of many participants in John Lennon and Yoko Ono's 1971 film Up Your Legs Forever.

He also collaborated with Jean-Luc Godard, who had been impressed by Primary. Their initial plan was to film "whatever we saw happening around us" in a small town in France, but this never came to fruition. In 1968, the two worked on a film that Godard initially conceived as "One AM" (One American Movie) on the subject of anticipated mass struggles in the United States – similar to the uprisings in France that year. When it became clear that Godard's assessment was incorrect, he abandoned the film. Pennebaker eventually finished the project himself and released it several years later as One PM, meaning "One Perfect Movie" to Pennebaker and "One Pennebaker Movie" to Godard.

Pennebaker's film company was also a notable distributor of foreign films, including Godard's La Chinoise (the American opening of which became the context for One PM), but the endeavor was ultimately a short-lived and costly business venture. Then around 1976, Pennebaker met experimental filmmaker turned documentarian Chris Hegedus. The two soon became collaborators and then married in 1982.

In 1988, Pennebaker, Hegedus and David Dawkins followed Depeche Mode as they toured the U.S. in support of Music for the Masses, the band's commercial breakthrough in America. The resulting film, 101, was released the following year, and prominently features a group of young fans travelling across America as winners of a "be-in-a-Depeche-Mode-movie-contest," which culminates at Depeche Mode's landmark concert at the Rose Bowl in Pasadena.  Because of this, the film is widely considered to be the impetus for the "reality" craze that swept MTV in the following years, including The Real World and Road Rules.  In various interviews, DVD commentaries and on their own website, both Pennebaker and Hegedus have cited 101 as "their favorite" and "the one that was the most fun to make" out of all their films to date.

In 1992, during the start of the Democratic primaries, Pennebaker and Hegedus approached campaign officials for Arkansas governor Bill Clinton about filming his presidential run. They were granted limited access to the candidate but allowed to focus on lead strategist James Carville and communications director George Stephanopoulos. The resulting work, The War Room, became one of their most celebrated films, winning the award for Best Documentary from the National Board of Review of Motion Pictures and earning an Academy Award nomination for Best Documentary Feature.

Later career
Pennebaker and Hegedus continued to produce a large number of documentary films through their company, Pennebaker Hegedus Films, most notably Moon Over Broadway (1998), Down from the Mountain (2001), Startup.com (2001), Elaine Stritch: At Liberty (2004), Al Franken: God Spoke (2006), and Kings of Pastry (2009).

In May 2010, they directed their first live show when they directed a YouTube webcast of the National performing a benefit show at the Brooklyn Academy of Music. That same year Kings of Pastry opened at multiple film festivals, including IDFA, Sheffield Doc/Fest, DOX BOX, the Berlin International Film Festival and Hot Docs, before premiering in New York City. In 2012 he was awarded a Governors Award, introduced by Michael Moore. In 2014 it was reported that Pennebaker, in collaboration with his wife, was working on a documentary focused on the Nonhuman Rights Project and its efforts to have certain animals, such as cetaceans, elephants, and apes, be classified as legal persons.

Death
Pennebaker died at his home in Sag Harbor, New York, on August 1, 2019.

Process and style

Pennebaker's films, usually shot with a hand-held camera, often eschew voice-over narration and interviews in favor of a "simple" portrayal of events typical of the direct cinema style Pennebaker helped popularize in the U.S. Of such an approach, Pennebaker told interviewer G. Roy Levin published in 1971 that "it's possible to go to a situation and simply film what you see there, what happens there, what goes on, and let everybody decide whether it tells them about any of these things. But you don't have to label them, you don't have to have the narration to instruct you so you can be sure and understand that it's good for you to learn." In that same interview with Levin, Pennebaker goes so far as to claim that Dont Look Back is "not a documentary at all by my standards". He instead repeatedly asserts that he does not make documentaries, but "records of moments", "half soap operas", and "semimusical reality things".

An accomplished engineer, Pennebaker developed one of the first fully portable, synchronized 16mm camera and sound recording systems which revolutionized modern filmmaking.

Legacy
His aesthetic and technical breakthroughs have also had a major influence on narrative filmmaking, influencing such realist masterworks as Barbara Loden's Wanda, which was filmed and edited by one of Pennebaker's protégés, Nicholas Proferes, and even acclaimed satires such as Tim Robbins' Bob Roberts.

His style has also been spoofed by Weird Al Yankovic and the Emmy-nominated mockumentary series Documentary Now.

Filmography

 Daybreak Express (1953) (music by Duke Ellington)
 Baby (1954)
 Opening in Moscow (1959)
 Breaking It Up at the Museum (1960)
 Anatomy of Cindy Fink (1960)
 Primary (1960) (National Film Registry Inductee)
 Jane (1962)
 Jingle Bells (1964) with Robert F. Kennedy
 You're Nobody Till Somebody Loves You (1964)
 Lambert & Co., or "Audition at RCA" (1964)
 Dont Look Back (1967, filmed 1965) with Bob Dylan (National Film Registry Inductee)
 Something Is Happening (unreleased, filmed 1966) with Bob Dylan
 Eat the Document (limited release, filmed 1966) with Bob Dylan
 Monterey Pop (1968, filmed 1967) (National Film Registry Inductee)
 Rainforest (1968)
 Little Richard: Keep on Rockin' (1970)
 Alice Cooper (1970)
 Queen of Apollo (1970)
 Sweet Toronto (1971, filmed 1969) with The Plastic Ono Band
 1 PM (1971)
 Original Cast Album: Company (1971) with Stephen Sondheim
 Energy War (1977)
 Ziggy Stardust and the Spiders from Mars (1979, filmed 1973) with David Bowie
 Town Bloody Hall (1979, filmed 1971)
 DeLorean (1981) with John DeLorean
 Dance Black America (1983)
 Jimi Plays Monterey (1986) with Jimi Hendrix
 Shake! Otis at Monterey (1987) with Otis Redding
 Otis Redding: Live at Monterey (1989)
 101 (1989) with Depeche Mode
 Jerry Lee Lewis: The Story of Rock & Roll (1991)
 Chuck Berry: Rock 'N Roll Music (1992)
 The War Room (1993) (Oscar nominee)
 Woodstock Diary (1994)
 Keine Zeit (1996) with German artist Marius Müller-Westernhagen
 Victoria Williams – Happy Come Home (1997) with singer Victoria Williams
 Moon Over Broadway (1997)
 Bessie (1998)
 Down from the Mountain (2000)
 Startup.com (2001)
 Only the Strong Survive (2002)
 Elaine Stritch: At Liberty (2004), Emmy-winning portrait of Elaine Stritch
 Assume the Position with Mr. Wuhl (2006) with Robert Wuhl
 Al Franken: God Spoke (2006) as executive producer
 65 Revisited (2007) – a one-hour documentary accompanying the new DVD release of Dont Look Back
 Kings of Pastry (2009)
 Unlocking the Cage (2016)

References

Further reading
 Aitken, Ian ed. Encyclopedia of the Documentary Film. Routledge (2005).
 Dave Saunders. Direct Cinema: Observational Documentary and the Politics of the Sixties. London: Wallflower Press, 2007.
 Pennebaker, D.A. "Interview with Donn Alan Pennebaker by G. Roy Levin". In Documentary Explorations: 15 Interviews with Film-makers, 221–70. Garden City, NY: Doubleday, 1971.
 Jeanne Hall. "Don't You Ever Just Watch?: American Cinema Verite and Don't Look Back. In Documenting the Documentary: Close Readings of Documentary Film and Video, 223–37. Detroit: Wayne State UP, 1998.

External links

 Pennebaker Hegedus Films
 
 Q&A with D. A. Pennebaker, 2007
 English language podcast interview with D.A. Pennebaker and Chris Hegedus
 D.A. Pennebaker, Robert Drew, Hope Ryden and James Lipscomb discuss Mooney vs. Fowle and Richard Leacock

1925 births
2019 deaths
Academy Honorary Award recipients
American documentary filmmakers
United States Navy personnel of World War II
Artists from Evanston, Illinois
Engineers from Illinois
Film directors from Illinois
Military personnel from Illinois
Yale University alumni